Ames Nowell State Park is a  Massachusetts state park located in the town of Abington. The park is managed by the Department of Conservation and Recreation
(DCR) (in season, a Forest and Park Supervisor I; off season, the ranger station at Wompatuck State Park). There is also a lot of history in the park, with miles upon miles of stone walls, two wagon bridges, and two quarries all dating back to the 1600s and 1700s.

Activities and amenities
The park's main feature is the man-made Cleveland Pond which is used for non-motorized boating and fishing. The park has boardwalks near the lake and trails for hiking, horseback riding, mountain biking, and cross-country skiing. The park also has a picnic area, playing field, and restroom facilities.

References

External links
Ames Nowell State Park Massachusetts Department of Conservation and Recreation
Ames Nowell State Park Trail Map Massachusetts Department of Conservation and Recreation

State parks of Massachusetts
Massachusetts natural resources
Parks in Plymouth County, Massachusetts
Abington, Massachusetts